Nevados de Chillán is a group of stratovolcanoes located in the Andes of Ñuble Region, Central Chile, and is one of the most active volcanoes in the region.  It consists of three overlapping peaks,  Cerro Blanco (Volcán Nevado) at the northwest and  Volcán Viejo (Volcán Chillán) at the southeast, with Volcán Nuevo in the middle.  Volcán Viejo was the main active vent during the 17th-19th centuries, and the new Volcán Nuevo lava dome complex formed between 1906 and 1945, eventually growing to exceed Viejo in height by the mid 1980s.

This complex contains two subcomplexes: Cerro Blanco and Las Termas. The subcomplex Cerro Blanco includes the volcanoes Santa Gertrudis, Gato, Cerro Blanco, Colcura, Calfú Pichicalfú and Baños. The subcomplex Las Termas includes the volcanoes Shangri-La, Nuevo, Arrau, Viejo, Chillán y Pata de Perro. In addition, near of the complex there are two pyroclastic satellite cones, the volcanoes Las Lagunillas and Parador.

See also
 Geothermal power in Chile
 List of volcanoes in Chile

References 

 
  304 pp.
  640 pp. (in Spanish; also includes volcanoes of Argentina, Bolivia, and Peru)
 

Volcanoes of Ñuble Region
Mountains of Chile
Stratovolcanoes of Chile
Active volcanoes
South Volcanic Zone
Pleistocene stratovolcanoes
Holocene stratovolcanoes